Twenty-eight or 28 may refer to:
 28 (number), the natural number following 27 and preceding 29
 one of the years 28 BC, AD 28, 1928, 2028
 28 (album), a 2005 electronic music album by Aoki Takamasa and Tujiko Noriko
 28 (book), a 2007 non-fiction book by Stephanie Nolen
 28 (2014 film), a Sri Lankan feature drama
 28 (2019 film), an Indian Malayalam-language film
 Twenty-eight (card game), an Indian trick-taking game for four players
 Twenty-eight, a nickname for the subspecies (Barnardius zonarius semitorquatus) of the Australian ringneck
 "Twenty Eight", a song by Karma to Burn from the album Wild, Wonderful Purgatory, 1999
 Toyota-28, a boat made by Toyota and Yanmar
 "28", a song by Agust D from D-2 mixtape